Sea Gem was the first British jack-up oil rig, known for its collapse off the coast of Lincolnshire on 27 December 1965, after two of its steel support legs buckled and the rig capsized, resulting in 13 fatalities.

Background 
In the early 1960s, oil companies had found some crude oil in Great Britain, as well as in the Netherlands and Germany, and suspected that there was more to be found under the North Sea. Barriers had to be overcome before it was to be possible to search for oil and gas. There had been no international agreements that addressed the rights to the various minerals and areas outside the  limit. Also, the technology required was not yet developed, or had not matured enough to be commercially usable.

The main factor was that the oil companies generally did not think that there were significant enough reserves in the North Sea to warrant the usage of resources to search for oil. This situation changed however, when fields such as the Groningen gas field in the Netherlands, and to a certain extent, Eakring in Nottinghamshire, proved to contain fairly large reserves, thus prompting the oil companies to begin a search in nearby areas, including the North Sea. Sea Gem made the first British discovery of natural gas in September 1965, although the find was too small to be commercially profitable.

Sea Gem was originally a 5,600 ton steel barge, converted to function as an oil rig by British Petroleum in 1964. The conversion involved fitting 10 steel legs, making it possible to raise the barge  over the water's surface; as well as a helipad, living quarters for the crew of 34, and a drilling tower with associated structures.

Disaster 
This process involved lowering the rig onto the surface of the water, to float it to the new site. When the rig was lowered, two of the legs crumpled and broke, causing the rig to capsize, with equipment and people sliding off and into the freezing cold of the North Sea.

As the radio hut was among the equipment that fell into the sea, the rig never sent out an emergency signal. The nearby British freight ship SS Baltrover observed the capsizing. Her crew sent out emergency signals and proceeded to help rescue the crew together with a Royal Air Force and civilian helicopter.

As a result of a public inquiry into the accident, several changes were made in order to improve the safety of oil rigs, amongst them the use of a stand-by boat, which would be able to help rescue crews in the event of future accidents, and the recognition of an offshore installation manager. The inquiry concluded brittle fracture in part of the suspension system linking the hull to the legs was to blame for the collapse.

See also 
 
 Minerals Workings (Offshore Installations) Act 1971

References

External links 
 Sea Gem at Dukes Wood Oil Museum

1965 disasters in the United Kingdom
December 1965 events in the United Kingdom
Collapsed oil platforms
Jack-up rigs
Maritime incidents in 1965
Ships of BP